The Ellerslie Sires Produce Stakes, currently known as the Sistema Stakes, is a Group One horse race for Thoroughbred two-year-olds held at Ellerslie Racecourse.

Run over 1200 metres in Auckland Cup Week in March, it is regarded as one of New Zealand's best two-year-old races along with the Manawatu Sires Produce Stakes (1400 m) at Awapuni, Palmerston North. 

The race has also been called the Diamond Stakes or Auckland Diamond Stakes.

The race is held on the same day as two of New Zealand's other most important races: the New Zealand Stakes and the Auckland Cup.

Recent results

See also 

 Karaka Million
 New Zealand Derby
 Thoroughbred racing in New Zealand

References

Horse races in New Zealand
Events in Auckland